Kuroki is a hamlet in the Rural Municipality of Sasman No. 336, Saskatchewan, Canada. Listed as a designated place by Statistics Canada, the hamlet had a population of 50 in the Canada 2016 Census. The community is named after the Japanese general Kuroki Tamemoto.

Demographics 

History

As an interesting aside, this village was founded after the Japanese had won several victories in the war against Russia (Russo-Japanese War 1904–05). Britain was allied with Japan in this war and Japan was a very popular nation throughout the British Empire. Three towns in Saskatchewan along the CN line (Togo, Kuroki, Mikado), a regional park (Oyama), and CN Siding (Fukushiama) were named in honour of Japanese achievements in this war.

Attractions

A Japanese Garden was created by residents, complete with rock gardens and small pond. It has a sign in Japanese saying "Kuroki Japanese Gardens." On the western edge of town there is a small Ukrainian Orthodox church and St. Helena Cemetery. The grain elevator still stands in good condition but has been purchased and is now owned privately.

Climate

See also 

 List of communities in Saskatchewan
 Hamlets of Saskatchewan
 Designated place

References

Sasman No. 336, Saskatchewan
Designated places in Saskatchewan
Organized hamlets in Saskatchewan
Division No. 10, Saskatchewan